William Holms Chambers Bartlett (September 1804 - February 11 1893) was an American military engineer
and educator, notable as a founding member of the National Academy of Sciences.

Biography
Bartlett was born in Pennsylvania, but moved as an infant to Missouri. He had little formal
education prior to his appointment to West Point by Senator Thomas H. Benton in 1822.
He graduated at the head of his class as a second lieutenant in the Corps of Engineers in 1826.

Bartlett was an expert in the construction of fortifications and was a principal in the
construction of Fort Monroe, Virginia, in 1828; and of Fort Adams, Newport, Rhode Island, 1829-32.
In 1836, he became professor of natural and experimental philosophy at West Point, where he
continued to teach until retiring from active service in 1871. His oil portrait from that year by
Robert Walter Weir is reproduced in West Point's digital art collection. 

After retiring from the Army as a colonel, Bartlett was an actuary for the Mutual Life Insurance Company of New York.

Bartlett received the degree of A. M. from Princeton in 1837; and of LL. D. from Hobart College (Geneva, N. Y.) in 1847. He was a member of the American Academy of Arts and Sciences (Boston) and of
the American Philosophical Society (Philadelphia), and one of the corporators and original members of the National Academy of Sciences in 1863.

References

1804 births
1893 deaths
American military engineers
United States Military Academy alumni
Princeton University alumni
Hobart and William Smith Colleges alumni